Dosinia lambata, or the silky dosinia, is a bivalve mollusc of the family Veneridae, endemic to New Zealand. It lives in depths of up to 60 metres (about 200 feet) and can grow to be 28 millimetres wide.

References

Dosinia
Bivalves of New Zealand
Bivalves described in 1850
Taxa named by Augustus Addison Gould